Merriman Creek is a  long second-order tributary to Verdigre Creek in Knox County, Nebraska.

Course
Merriman Creek rises on the Bazile Creek divide about 5 miles southwest of Creighton, Nebraska in Antelope County and then flows northwest into Knox County to join Verdigre Creek about 4 miles west-southwest of Winnetoon, Nebraska.

Watershed
Merriman Creek drains  of area, receives about 26.7 in/year of precipitation, has a wetness index of 519.83, and is about 2.51% forested.

See also

List of rivers of Nebraska

References

Rivers of Antelope County, Nebraska
Rivers of Knox County, Nebraska
Rivers of Nebraska